The 1984–85 season was the 47th season of competitive association football in the Football League played by Chester City, an English club based in Chester, Cheshire.

Also, it was the third season spent in the Fourth Division after the relegation from the Third Division in 1982. Alongside competing in the Football League the club also participated in the FA Cup, the Football League Cup and the Associate Members' Cup.

Football League

Results summary

Results by matchday

Matches

FA Cup

League Cup

Associate Members' Cup

Season statistics

References

1984-85
English football clubs 1984–85 season